Amadis of Greece (Amadís de Grecia) is a tale of knight-errantry written by Feliciano de Silva, a “sequel-specialist” who continued the adventures of Amadis de Gaula in this ninth installment.  Its full title is Noveno libro de Amadís de Gaula, crónica del muy valiente y esforzado príncipe y caballero de la Ardiente Espada Amadís de Grecia, hijo de Lisuarte de Grecia, emperador de Constantinopla y de Trapisonda, y rey de Rodas.

Published in 1530, the book is divided into two parts which deal with the adventures of Amadis of Greece, Knight of the Burning Sword, son of Lisuarte of Greece and Onoloria of Trabizond (Trapisonda), as well as his love for both Princess Lucela of France and Princess Niquea of Thebes, whom he subsequently marries.

Silva followed this work with another – Don Florisel de Niquea (Sir Florisel of Nicaea) (1532) – which deals with the knightly adventures and loves of first-born son of Amadís de Grecia and Princess Niquea, and with the later Don Rogel de Grecia (Sir Rogel of Greece) (1535).

The book is mentioned in the novel Don Quixote by Miguel de Cervantes, in particular it is included in the list of works of The library of Don Quixote.

1530 books
1530 novels
1530s fantasy novels
Renaissance literature
Romance (genre)
Sequel novels
Spanish fantasy novels